Ayatollah is an honorific title for high-ranking Twelver Shia clergy in Iran and Iraq that came into widespread usage in the 20th century.

Etymology
The title is originally derived from Arabic word  pre-modified with the definite article  and post-modified with the word Allah, making . The combination has been translated to English as 'Sign of God', 'Divine Sign' or 'Reflection of God'. It is a frequently-used term in Quran, but its usage in this context is presumably a particular reference to the verse  "We shall show them Our signs on the horizons and in their own selves", while it has been also used to refer to The Twelve Imams by Shias.

Origins
The earliest known address of this title is for Ibn Mutahhar Al-Hilli (died 1374), however it was not in use until the recent century. Glassé states that following domination of Twelver branch by followers of  school and demise of  school, the title was popularized by s as an attempt to promote their status. Mirza Ali Aqa Tabrizi was the first one to use the term  for the sources of emulation in Najaf, especially Akhund Khurasani, to distinguish them from the clerics of lower rank in Tehran, during the democratic revolution of Iran.

Hamid Algar maintains that this title entered general usage possibly because it was an "indirect result of the reform and strengthening of the religious institution in Qom". Abdul-Karim Haeri Yazdi who founded Qom Seminary, may be the first to bear the title according to Algar.

Loghatnameh Dehkhoda indicates that during the Persian Constitutional Revolution (1905–1911), the honorific was used by constitutionalists to refer to Mirza Sayyed Mohammad Tabatabai and Seyyed Abdollah Behbahani.

While the title Ayatollah was sporadically used during the 1930s, it became widespread in the 1940s.

Contemporary usage

Usage by location 
The Sunni community of Iran does not use this title. It is also absent in the vocabulary of Shias in Lebanon, Pakistan, and India. In Iraq, while the title is not unknown, it is only used for clerics of Iranian origin.

Devaluation trend
The title Ayatollah has been cheapened in the recent decades.

Michael M. J. Fischer opines in Iran: From Religious Dispute to Revolution that the Iranian revolution led to "rapid inflation of religious titles", and almost every senior cleric was called an Ayatollah.

The same phenomenon happened to the title Hujjat al-Islam before, which is today a less prestigious title than Ayatollah. However, as of 19th century it was given to people who were not only Mujtahids, but also were the most distinguished clerics of that time. Today there are "tens of thousands" called with that title, who are just aspiring to become a Mujtahid.

This trend led to invention of a new title called Ayatollah al-Uzma. In the beginning, about half a dozen people were addressed with the latter title, but as of 2015, the number of people who claimed that title was reportedly over 50.

Political connotations
Addressing someone with or without this title may have political reasons, rather than for purely religious credentials.

Ali Khamenei—who was addressed with mid-level title of Hujjat al-Islam when he was in office as President—was bestowed the title Ayatollah immediately after he became Supreme Leader of Iran in 1989, without meeting regular unwritten criteria (such as authoring a Risalah). Since the 2010s, sources under government control tend to give him more distinguished titles like Grand Ayatollah and Imam.

Certain clerics have been downgraded by not being addressed as an Ayatollah, such as Mohammad Kazem Shariatmadari and Hussein-Ali Montazeri.

Qualifications

Though no formal hierarchical structure exists among Shia clerics, a "hierarchy of difference" can be elaborated to describe the situation. Traditionally, the title Ayatollah was awarded by popular usage to prominent figures only –who were necessarily a Mujtahid– and it was reserved for the very few highest rank clerics. Plus qualification as a definite Mujtahid, such person was regarded among his peers superior in aʿlamīyat and riyāsat, the latter being determined by popular acclamation, as well as collecting a huge amount of Khums (religious taxes). Those conditions being applied, by 1960s a cleric addressed as an Ayatollah was expected to be a Marja'.

Roy Mottahedeh describes how the title  of ayatollah was determined in the mid to late 20th century.

An unwritten rule of addressing for Shia clerics has been developed after the 1980s as a result of Iranian Revolution, despite the fact no official institutional way of conferring titles is available. Since 1979, the number of individuals who call themselves an Ayatollah, instead of being recipient of that title, has raised dramatically. The title that was previously customary for addressing a Marja', was gradually applied to an established Mujtahid. With recent bureaucratization of Shia seminaries under the current regime, four levels of studies were introduced and those clerics who end the fourth level, also known as Dars-e-Kharej and pass the final exam, were called Ayatollahs. Moojan Momen wrote in 2015 that every cleric who finished his training calls himself an Ayatollah and this trend has led to emergence of "thousands of Ayatollahs".

Stages of contemporary titles for Shia clerics in Iran can be understood from the following table:

Grand Ayatollah 

Only a few of the most important ayatollahs are accorded the rank of Grand Ayatollah (Ayatollah Uzma, "Great Sign of God"). When an ayatollah gains a significant following and they are recognized for religiously correct views, they are considered a Marja'-e-Taqlid, which in common parlance is "grand ayatollah". Usually as a prelude to such status, a mujtahid is asked to publish a juristic treatise in which he answers questions about the application of Islam to present-time daily affairs. Risalah is the word for treatise, and such a juristic work is called a risalah-yi'amaliyyah or "practical law treatise", and it is usually a reinvention of the book Al-Urwatu l-Wuthqah.

See also 

 Ulama
 Faqīh
 Allamah
 Mullah
 Akhoond
 Sheikh
 Clericalism in Iran
 List of current Maraji

Explanatory notes

References

Citations

General and cited sources

External links 
 

 
Hawza
Islamic honorifics
Islamic Persian honorifics
Quranic words and phrases
Religious titles
Shia clerics